Windsor was a ship wrecked on Long Reef near Sydney, Australia in 1816.

Windsor was a sloop of 22 tons owned and under the command of Henry Major.  Windsor left the Hawkesbury and headed for Sydney when she was blown well off shore by a gale.  It is probable that it was this gale that ended up sinking Recovery the same month.  Eventually Windsor reached Newcastle where she picked up Recoverys survivors.  Coming into Sydney the ship was wrecked on Long Reef but all of Windsors crew and Recoverys survivors were able to get to safety and walk to Sydney.

References

1788–1850 ships of Australia
1816 in Australia
Coastal trading vessels of Australia
History of New South Wales
Individual sailing vessels
Maritime incidents in 1816
Ships built in Australia
Shipwrecks of the Northern Sydney Region
Sloops of Australia